Catherine Saint Jude Pretorius, professionally known as Dope Saint Jude, is a South African rapper, singer, songwriter and music producer.

Early life
Dope Saint Jude was born in Cape Town and grew up in Elsies River. She taught herself the guitar at the age of 12 and began writing poetry to accompany her music. She later went into her own brand of hip hop, which has been described as a soundtrack for feminist inclusivity, acceptance and empowerment. She has been noted for bringing a "queer" edge to the hip hop scene.

Career
She began her career in 2011, performing as Saint Dude, a drag king. At this time, she started South Africa's first documented drag king troupe. In 2013, Saint Jude left the troupe to pursue a career as a solo performer.

In 2016, she collaborated with M.I.A. to be part of H&M’s awareness-raising campaign video for world recycle week. In July 2016, Saint Jude released her self-produced debut EP, Reimagine. In 2017, she was featured on the Jlin album, Black Origami.

She has performed at the Cape Town International Jazz Festival in 2017, Stanford University in 2017 and Afropunk Festival Johannesburg in 2018. 
 
In November 2018, she released her second EP, Resilient. The lead single, "Grrrl Like" was released in October 2018. The song been used for the Apple TV show Dickinson, the anime Netflix show Kipo and the Age of Wonderbeasts, car manufacturer's advert and in the trailer of Netflix’s South African original series, Blood & Water.

In April 2022, she released her third EP, Higher Self.

Discography
Reimagine (2016)
Resilient (2018)
Higher Self (2022)

References

External links
 
 

Living people
People from Cape Town
South African women rappers
South African singer-songwriters
South African songwriters
South African hip hop musicians
Year of birth missing (living people)